Galušak is a settlement in the Slovene Hills in northeastern Slovenia. It lies in the Municipality of Sveti Jurij ob Ščavnici. The area is part of the traditional Styria region and is now included in the Mura Statistical Region.

References

External links
Galušak at Geopedia

Populated places in the Municipality of Sveti Jurij ob Ščavnici